Love Jacked is a Canadian romantic comedy film, directed by Alfons Adetuyi and released in 2018. The film was shot primarily in Hamilton, Ontario, with some location shooting in Cape Town, South Africa.

Plot
The film stars Amber Stevens West as Maya, a young woman on a trip to South Africa. While there she enters a whirlwind romance with Mtumbie (Demetrius Grosse), but shortly before returning home she breaks off their engagement when she catches him with another woman.

To protect herself from the disapproval of her father (Keith David), she enlists Malcolm (Shamier Anderson), a Canadian pool hustler on the run from his vengeful partner in crime Tyrell (Lyriq Bent), to impersonate Mtumbie.

Over a number of days, Malcolm gets to know Maya's family and Maya herself. He shows his carpentry skills helping her dad build a small studio, and he and Maya connect while joking around with some paints on a canvas. She gets herself and family members outfitted for the wedding ceremony.

In the meantime, Tyrell sees Malcolm in town and demands he give his split of an earlier pool hustle, which he doesn't have because he returned it. Malcolm lets Tyrell think he's impersonating Mtumbie to scam the family out of money, when in reality he's planning to fake his death for Maya's sake.

At the wake, both the real Mtumbie and Malcolm show up. Maya and Malcolm declare their feelings for each other, and Maya's cousin Naomi (Nicole Lyn) flirts with Mtumbie.

Cast

 Keith David as Ed, Maya's dad
 Amber Stevens West as Maya
 Shamier Anderson as Malcolm
 Lyriq Bent	as Tyrell
 Mike Epps as Uncle Rufus
 Marla Gibbs as Rose
 Demetrius Grosse as Mtumbie
 Nicole Lyn as Naomi
 Kim Roberts as Aunt Hilary

Awards and nominations
The film received a Canadian Screen Award nomination for Best Hair (Renée Chan) at the 7th Canadian Screen Awards.

References

External links 
 

2018 films
2018 romantic comedy films
Canadian romantic comedy films
English-language Canadian films
Films directed by Alfons Adetuyi
2010s English-language films
2010s Canadian films